Devil's Chest is a 2017 Ugandan war film about the Lord's Resistance Army insurgency in northern Uganda. It was written, produced and directed by Hassan Mageye and stars Hasifah Nande Nakitende and Samuel Rogers Masaaba in the lead roles. It premiered in Gulu in October 2017 and in Kampala in May 2019.

Summary

During the Lords Resistance Army (LRA) in northern Uganda, a village woman is forced to be a wife of the rebel leader Joseph Kony, the man who killed her husband. She becomes a soldier and fights for her freedom.

Reception

The film was well received in Uganda and across Africa for its story, acting and direction. It received the most nominations (nine) at the 5th Uganda Film Festival Awards in 2017 and won four awards including Best Feature Film and Best Director. It was also nominated at the 2018 Africa Magic Viewers' Choice Awards (AMVCA) awards for Best Movie East African and Best Overall Movie.  Some of the technical, story and action aspects of the film were however criticised. Collins Kakwezi of Amakula Film Festival called the film a botched project citing that the action scenes were lacking and that the rebel leader, Joseph Kony was portrayed as a kind man through actor Samuel Rogers Masaaba.

Awards

References

External links
 

Films set in Uganda
Films shot in Uganda
English-language Ugandan films
2017 films
Ugandan war films
2010s English-language films